Los Calafates Airport ,  is an airport serving Chonchi, a coastal town on Chiloé Island in the Los Lagos Region of Chile.

See also

Transport in Chile
List of airports in Chile

References

External links
OpenStreetMap - Huillinco
OurAirports - Los Calafates
FallingRain - Los Calafates Airport

Airports in Chile
Airports in Chiloé Archipelago